Ejgil Becker Clemmensen (21 June 1890 – 24 October 1932) was a Danish rowing coxswain who competed in the 1912 Summer Olympics.

He was the coxswain of the Danish boat which won the bronze medal in the coxed four.

References

External links
profile

1890 births
1932 deaths
Danish male rowers
Rowers at the 1912 Summer Olympics
Olympic rowers of Denmark
Olympic bronze medalists for Denmark
Coxswains (rowing)
Olympic medalists in rowing
Medalists at the 1912 Summer Olympics